Elizabeth Vlotman (born Elizabeth Truter; 9 November 1954) is a South African former professional tennis player.

Active on tour in the 1970s, Vlotman featured twice in the singles main draw at Wimbledon. In 1975 she was beaten in the first round by Billie Jean King, then in 1976 she fell in the second round.

Vlotman, now settled in the United Kingdom, has since worked as a teacher and in tennis promotion. She married retail tycoon Clive Vlotman (a Dixons executive and owner of Powerstore).

References

External links
 
 

1954 births
Living people
South African female tennis players